Tell the Truth may refer to:

Arts, entertainment, and media

 Tell the Truth (film), 1946
"Tell the Truth", a 1958 song by The "5" Royales
Tell the Truth (Otis Redding album), 1970, or the title song
"Tell the Truth" (song), a 1970 song by Derek and the Dominos
"Tell the Truth", a song by 2nd Chapter of Acts from the 1980 album The Roar of Love
Tell the Truth (Billy Squier album), 1993
Tell the Truth (British game show)

Other uses
Tell the Truth (Belarus), political campaign in the Republic of Belarus

See also
To Tell the Truth (disambiguation)
Tell Us the Truth (1978 album) by Sham '69
 Lenny Bruce: Swear to Tell the Truth (1998 film) documentary
 sworn testimony, including the phrase "swear, to tell the truth, the whole truth, and nothing but the truth"